I Was at Home, But is a 2019 German drama film directed by Angela Schanelec. It was selected to compete for the Golden Bear at the 69th Berlin International Film Festival. At Berlin, Schanelec won the Silver Bear for Best Director. The film also competed at the  34th Mar del Plata International Film Festival, where Schanelec was awarded with the Silver Ástor for Best Director.

Plot
The film follows the existential conflict between a mother and teachers over a 13-year-old student returning home after being missing for a week.

Cast
 Maren Eggert as Astrid
 Clara Möller as Flo
 Jakob Lassalle as Phillip
 Franz Rogowski as Lars
 Alan Williams as Herr Meisner
 Devid Striesow as Gertjan
 Lilith Stangenberg as Claudia

Reception 
On review aggregator website Rotten Tomatoes, the film holds an approval rating of  based on  reviews. The site's critical consensus reads, "I Was at Home, But... withholds easy gratification, but viewers who settle into its austere rhythms will be rewarded with a story rich with meaning."

References

External links
 

2019 films
2019 drama films
Films directed by Angela Schanelec
German drama films
2010s German-language films
2010s German films